Jeff Barlow was a British actor who was born in Lancashire in 1871.

Selected filmography
 Rupert of Hentzau (1915)
 The Man Who Bought London (1916)
 Trouble for Nothing (1916)
 Love's Old Sweet Song (1917)
 The Happy Warrior (1917)
 Bonnie Mary (1918)
 The Man and the Moment (1918)
 Once Upon a Time (1918)
 The Splendid Coward (1918)
 A Master of Men (1918)
 The Lackey and the Lady (1919)
 The Homemaker (1919)
 Castles in Spain (1920)
 Beyond the Dreams of Avarice (1920)
 The Glorious Adventure (1922)
 The Skipper's Wooing (1922)
 Was She Justified? (1922)
 The Lady Owner (1923)
 Hornet's Nest (1923)
 Chu-Chin-Chow (1923)
 Sen Yan's Devotion (1924)
 Satan's Sister (1925)
 The Marriage Business (1927)

References

External links

1871 births
Date of death unknown
Male actors from Lancashire
English male film actors
English male silent film actors
20th-century English male actors
English male stage actors